Alexander Bocharov (born 26 February 1975 in Irkutsk; name also spelled Alexandre Botcharov), is a Russian professional road bicycle racer most recently riding for UCI ProTeam .

Major results

1999
 1st, Stage 9, Tour de l'Avenir
2001
 17th, Tour de France
 3rd, Stage 16
2002
 14th, Midi Libre
 15th, Critérium du Dauphiné Libéré
 30th, Tour de France
 2nd, Stage 14
2003
 9th, Classique des Alpes
2004
 8th, Classique des Alpes
2006
 4th, Clasica San Sebastian
 6th, Tour of Poland
 4th, Stage 7
 8th, World Championship
 10th, Critérium International
 2nd, Stage 2
 11th, Tour de Suisse
2007
 11th, Paris–Nice
 5th, Stage 7
 11th, Critérium International
 20th, Vuelta al País Vasco
2008
 1st, Tour Méditerranéen
 1st, Stage 3
 18th Overall, Tour de France
2010
 1st, Stage 3, Tour du Limousin

External links
Profile at Crédit Agricole official website 

1975 births
Living people
Russian male cyclists
Sportspeople from Irkutsk